Mbarara City FC is a football club in Mbarara City, Uganda. The team plays in the top division of Ugandan professional football, the Star Times Uganda Premier League where they have been participating since 5 May 2017, after defeating Synergy FC in the FUFA Big League Play Offs, and the club uses Kakyeka Stadium as their home hosting grounds. Mbarara City FC has more fans than any other team in the Western Region of Uganda.

History
The club was founded in 2010 as Citizens FC, after the management of Citizens High School in Mbarara decided to create a team to play in mature competitions and help in nurturing football at the school. The team played in the Western Uganda regional league starting from 2010 to 2014. In 2014, the team won the Western Uganda Regional League and was promoted to the FUFA Big League. In July 2016, Citizens FC was renamed Mbarara City FC, mainly to get acceptability and fan base among the people of Mbarara and the whole of Western Uganda. This coincided with the club being promoted to the topflight, the Uganda Premier League in its first season after adopting the name Mbarara City FC. The club clinched promotion after defeating Synergy 2-1 in the FUFA Big League playoffs on 5 May 2017.

2017/2018 Uganda Premier League Season
Mbarara City FC participated in the Uganda Premier League Season, the first division of the Uganda football league. In their first season in the top flight, it was the only team out of 16 that was based in Western Uganda. Its first game was played against Bul FC on 12 September 2017, and the result was a goalless draw. This was followed by a 1-0 win against Express FC with a goal scored by Pitis Barenge, a Burundian International in the 73rd minute on 16 September. The club finished 11th, avoiding relegation.

2018/19 Uganda Premier League Season
Mbarara City were excluded from the Uganda Premier League at the start of the season, after failing a ground inspection, but appealed the exclusion and were reinstated. Mbarara City were on top of the standings just after eight games with sixteen points. Paul Mucurezi scored the only goal against Bul to take Mbarara City to the top of the table for the first time in history. Mbarara City won its first four home games, a club record. Their first round match was rescheduled after they moved to the Kavumba recreation ground. Mbarara City played 3 matches at Kavumba and won all of them (Mbarara City 3-1 Express, Mbarara City 2-0 Maroons & Mbarara City 2-1 Villa). The club has since returned to Kakyeka stadium in Mbarara.

Stadium
The team play their home games at Kakyeka Stadium, in Mbarara City, which has a capacity of 10,000.

Supporters
The bulk of Mbarara City FC supporters come from the Western Ugandan districts of Mbarara, Isingiro, Ibanda, Kiruhura, Ntungamo, Sheema, Bushenyi and the country's Capital City of Kampala.

Notable players
Paul Mucureezi
Hillary Mukundane
Ivan Eyam
Ali Kimera
Ibrahim Orit
Makueth Wol
Brian Aheebwa
Jude Ssemugabi
Martin Elugant

Achievements
Western Regional League: 1
 2014
FUFA Big League Playoffs: 1
2017

References

External links
Tracing Uganda’s football history
The Ankole Times

Football clubs in Uganda
Western Region, Uganda
2010 establishments in Uganda